The England cricket team toured the West Indies from 25 February to 13 March 2014, playing a three-match One Day International series and three T20I matches against the West Indies team. England won the ODI series 2–1, with the West Indies winning the T20 series by the same score.

In the third ODI, England batsman Joe Root broke his right thumb when he was hit by the third ball of his innings, but went on to make a century; however, the injury was deemed serious enough to rule him out of the T20I series. England captain Stuart Broad injured his knee in the first T20 match, meaning that Eoin Morgan captained the squad for the remaining games.

Squads

Tour matches

UWI Vice Chancellor's XI vs England XI

ODI series

1st ODI

2nd ODI

3rd ODI

T20I series

1st T20I

2nd T20I

3rd T20I

References

2013-14
International cricket competitions in 2013–14
England
2014 in English cricket
2014 in West Indian cricket